The Roman Catholic Diocese of Zhumadian/Chumatien is a diocese located in the city of Zhumadian (Henan) in the Ecclesiastical province of Kaifeng in China.

History
 March 2, 1933: Established as the Apostolic Prefecture of Zhumadian 駐馬店 from the Apostolic Vicariate of Nanyangfu 南陽府 and the Apostolic Prefecture of Xinyangzhou 信陽州
 November 9, 1944: Promoted as Apostolic Vicariate of Zhumadian 駐馬店
 April 11, 1946: Promoted as Diocese of Zhumadian 駐馬店

Leadership
 Bishops of Zhumadian 駐馬店 (Roman rite)
 Bishop Joseph Mary Yuan Ke-zhi (Yüen K’ai-chih) (袁克治) (April 11, 1946 – January 30, 1969)
 Vicars Apostolic of Zhumadian 駐馬店 (Roman Rite)
 Bishop Joseph Mary Yuan Ke-zhi (Yüen K’ai-chih) (袁克治) (November 9, 1944 – April 11, 1946)
 Prefects Apostolic of Zhumadian 駐馬店 (Roman Rite)
 Fr. Joseph Mary Yuan Ke-zhi (Yüen K’ai-chih) (袁克治) (later Bishop) (1939 – November 9, 1944)
 Fr. Peter Wang (August 4, 1933 – 1938)

References

 GCatholic.org
 Catholic Hierarchy

Roman Catholic dioceses in China
Christian organizations established in 1933
Roman Catholic dioceses and prelatures established in the 20th century
1933 establishments in China
Christianity in Henan